Forget Me Not is a 2010 British romantic drama film, directed by Alexander Holt and Lance Roehrig and starring Tobias Menzies and Genevieve O'Reilly. It was first shown at the Rhode Island International Film Festival in August 2010, and was released in the US on 4 March 2011 and in the UK on 6 May 2011.

Plot
Will Fletcher is a musician, and Eve Fisher works in a pub where he is performing, during one night in London. After Will saves Eve from a drunken customer at closing time, they stay up all night together, meandering through the streets of London and forging a relationship. Next morning, Eve takes him to see her Alzheimer's-suffering grandmother.

Cast
 Tobias Menzies as Will Fletcher
 Genevieve O'Reilly as Eve Fisher
 Luke de Woolfson as Luke
 Charlie Covell as Carly
 Susie Harriet as Suze
 Gemma Jones as Lizzie Fisher
 Nigel Cooke as Jim

Reception
On Rotten Tomatoes the film has an approval rating of 69% based on reviews from 13 critics. 
Dennis Harvey in Variety found the film "a pleasant if slender affair reminiscent of Before Sunrise, with a little Once tossed in", that "moves gracefully toward a conclusion that will trigger tears from some viewers, though others may find it a bit too heavy a tragic load for the film to bear." Tom Huddleston in Time Out, wrote that "A frequent criticism of ultra-low-budget independent movies is that they try to do too much. 'Forget Me Not' may even be guilty of doing too little – but what it does attempt, it largely pulls off" and concluded that "ambitious it ain't, but Forget Me Not is a modest, memorable and rather moving slice of DIY cinema." Patrick Smith in The Daily Telegraph compared the film to Richard Linklater's Before Sunrise and Before Sunset, but found that although it "isn't quite as accomplished", Menzies and O'Reilly ''have enough chemistry for the climax to be surprisingly poignant." Roger Ebert concluded that the film resembles Linklater's films, but "moves along too deliberately", and although the ending "conceals an emotional impact, sad and carefully orchestrated...the film isn't very compelling."

Awards
The film won Best UK Film and Best Editing at the 2015 London Independent Film Festival and the Golden Ace at the Las Vegas Film Festival.

References

External links
 
 Forget Me Not official website

2010 films
2010 romantic drama films
British romantic drama films
Films about Alzheimer's disease
Films set in London
2010s English-language films
2010s British films